Code-switching is the use of more than one language in speech.

Code-switching or Code Switch may also refer to:
 Code Switch, a race and culture outlet and weekly podcast from National Public Radio in the United States
 Code switching (football), players who have converted from one football code to another

See also
 Code (disambiguation)
 Code-mixing, the mixing of two or more languages or language varieties
 Macaronic language, text using a mixture of languages
 Switch (disambiguation)
 Switching (disambiguation)